Hady Habib (born 21 August 1998) is an American-born Lebanese tennis player. 
Habib has a career high ATP singles ranking of 408 and a career-high ATP doubles ranking of 960. Habib has won 8 ITF Futures singles title and 4 ITF Futures doubles title. Habib has represented Lebanon at the Davis Cup, where he has a win–loss record of 15–5 in singles and a 4–5 record in doubles.
Habib also graduated with a degree in Sports Management from Texas A&M University in College Station.

Davis Cup 

   indicates the outcome of the Davis Cup match followed by the score, date, place of event, the zonal classification and its phase, and the court surface.

Challenger and Futures/World Tennis Tour Finals

Singles: 9 (5–4)

Doubles: 5 (2–3)

References

External links
 
 
 
 
 Hady Habib at Texas A&M University

1998 births
Living people
Lebanese male tennis players
American male tennis players
Texas A&M Aggies men's tennis players
American people of Lebanese descent
Competitors at the 2018 Mediterranean Games
Tennis players at the 2018 Asian Games
Tennis players from Houston
Asian Games competitors for Lebanon
Mediterranean Games competitors for Lebanon
Sportspeople of Lebanese descent